Acasă (meaning "At home"), formerly known as Pro 2 between 2017 and 2022, is a television channel operated by Central European Media Enterprises (through Warner Bros. Discovery), that broadcasts in Romania. It is an entertainment station, primarily dedicated to daytime series, family movies, talk shows, soap operas and news programs. Its sister is the television channel Acasă Gold that was launched on April 15, 2012; it airs reruns of the telenovelas that aired on Acasă and, especially, classical telenovelas, including some PRO TV shows.

On March 7, 2022, it was announced that Pro 2 will revert its name back to Acasă. The branding effect took place on April 4, 2022 at 07:00 EET.

Shows 
Acasă TV mainly broadcast shows like:

 Poveștiri adevărate (2007-2014)
 Casa Ibacka (2013-2014)
 Doctorul casei (2006-2014)
 Poveștiri de Noapte (2007-2014, reruns in 2014-2019)
 Dincolo de Poveștiri (reruns in 2014-2019)
 În al 9-lea cer
 CanCan TV
 Corazon Latino

And segments, like:

 Știrile de Acasă
 Muzica de Acasă
 Rețeta de Acasă
 Zodiacul de Acasă
 Vremea de Acasă
 Vești bune de Acasă

Those segments were discontinued later in 2013, but however, Muzica de Acasă was seen later on its Moldovian version, Acasă în Moldova.

On 9th May 2014 the programs were restructured as Acasă TV started to broadcast reruns and telenovelas only.

Programming

Syndicated telenovelas

Original telenovelas

References

External links
Official website

Central European Media Enterprises
Pro TV
Television channels and stations established in 1998
Television stations in Romania